is a Japanese slice-of-life romance manga series written and illustrated by Setona Mizushiro. It was serialized in Chorus magazine, later relaunched as Cocohana magazine, from December 2009 to March 2015 and collected as five  volumes by publisher Shueisha. The series was adapted into a live-action film that premiered in Japan in May 2015, as well as a stage play that ran at the New National Theatre, Tokyo, in March 2020, both directed by Yūichi Satō and officially titled Poison Berry in My Brain in English.

Characters

 
 Portrayed by: Yōko Maki (film), Misako Renbutsu (stage play)
 The series' main character, a shy 30-something whose inner thoughts appear to readers as a board of five very different individuals. When she falls for a younger man at a drinking party, the board members fall into a panic. 
 
 Portrayed by: Yuki Furukawa (film), Aoto Watanabe (stage play)
 Ichiko's love interest. 
 
 Portrayed by: Sonha (film), Shunya Shiraishi (stage play)
 A publishing company editor who shows interest in Ichiko.
 
 Portrayed by: Hidetoshi Nishijima (film), Hayato Ichihara (stage play)
 The leader of Ichiko's board members. He is generally the member who initiates group votes on Ichiko's next actions.
 
 Portrayed by: Ryunosuke Kamiki (film), Katsuki Motodaka (stage play)
 An optimistic board member with a hopeful outlook for Ichiko's future.
 
 Portrayed by: Yō Yoshida (film),  (stage play)
 A negative board member who believes that most of Ichiko's actions will end badly.
 
 Portrayed by: Hiyori Sakurada (film),  (stage play)
 A Gothic Lolita board member who thinks and votes on impulse, rather than weighing the pros and cons.
 
 Portrayed by:  (film), Kim Kwangsu (stage play)
 An elderly board member caught up in the past.

Volumes

Reception

Nōnai Poison Berry ranked 20th in the 2013  Top 20 Manga for Female Readers survey. It was also a Jury Selection in the Manga Division at the 17th Japan Media Arts Festival Awards.

References

External links

  
  (defunct; link via the Wayback Machine) 
  
 

2009 manga
Josei manga
Manga adapted into films
Romance anime and manga
Setona Mizushiro
Shueisha manga
Slice of life anime and manga
Japanese romance films